The Mission  (jyutping: Coeng1 Fo2, lit. The Gunfire) is a 1999 Hong Kong action film produced and directed Johnnie To, and starring Anthony Wong, Francis Ng, Jackie Lui, Lam Suet, and Simon Yam.

Plot
Triad boss Lung survives an assassination attempt in a restaurant, with one of his men being killed during the hit. The restaurant is owned by "Fat Cheung", an underboss of Lung's triad.

To ensure his safety, Lung's right hand man and brother, Frank has hired five bodyguards to stay close to their boss 24/7; Curtis normally works as a hairdresser and is the considered to be a veteran of the group, the loner James, night club owner Roy and his younger gang colleague Shin and Mike, a former pimp.

An initial assassination attempt on Lung fails when a sniper attacks the cars with Lung and his bodyguards from the rooftop of a high-rise. Lung gets shot, but a bullet-proof vest prevents further damage. The men manage to fight off the attack and Curtis decides to leave in the cars with Lung, James, Mike and Shin even though Roy hasn't returned (he left the scene to pursue a second attacker). Roy returns angrily in a taxi to Lung's house and beats up Curtis (who doesn't oppose). The next day Curtis makes amends by killing a criminal who harassed Roy's night club.

The five bodyguards are fighting off two additional assassination attempts and trail a surviving hitman to the hideout of the attackers. After a gunfight they manage to capture one of the assassins alive. It becomes evident that the hits were contracted by Fat Cheung and Lung sends his henchmen Frank to kill him. The bodyguards kill the captured hitman and the five men celebrate the end of their mission in a restaurant.

Frank hands out five envelopes with the pay to Curtis and tells him that he learnt about an affair between Shin and the wife of Lung. He requests that Shin executed and Curtis tells him that he'll handle it. Curtis drives to James, asks him for a gun and arranges a meeting with Shin in the evening. James warns Roy and since he's responsible for Shin as his boss, he confronts him with the allegation. Shin confesses having been seduced by Mrs. Lung. Roy tells Curtis that he can't allow for Shin to be killed. They form the plan to have Shin escape in a boat to Taiwan but eventually discard the plan since Frank would then pursue Roy and the rest of them for failing instead.

In the evening the five men meet in an otherwise empty restaurant to sort out the situation. James leaves to ask Lung for clemency and to spare Shin's life. When he arrives at Lung's house he witnesses a henchmen of Lung killing the unfaithful Mrs. Lung. James realises the hopelessness of his attempt and returns to the restaurant where it comes to a Mexican standoff between the men. Curtis shoots Shin, while Roy empties his magazine without aiming at Curtis. When the men leave the restaurant, Curtis throws a blank towards James, thus revealing that the death of Shin (who escapes through the backdoor) was staged for Lung.

Production 
According to To, they shot the film in 18 days.

Reception
The Mission was well received. The review aggregator Rotten Tomatoes reported that 60% of critics have given the film a positive review based on 5 reviews, with an average rating of 5.56/10. In a 2004 interview with director Johnnie To for the website GreenCine, Sean Axmaker states that The Mission is "the best crime film to come from Hong Kong in years. It's austere and still, beautifully composed and tense, and the characters are professional and efficient, positioning themselves for efficiency and communicating and interacting silently while on the job." Similarly, an overview of To's body of work that precedes an interview for the magazine Cineaste refers to the film as "To's masterpiece," "a brilliantly conceived, shot, and edited gangster film."

In 2014, Time Out polled several film critics, directors, actors and stunt actors to list their top action films. The Mission was listed at 86th place on this list.

Awards and nominations

References

External links

 
The Mission at LoveHKFilm.com
The Mission at Rotten Tomatoes

1999 films
1990s Cantonese-language films
1999 crime thriller films 
Hong Kong action films
Hong Kong New Wave films
Hong Kong crime films 
Films directed by Johnnie To
Milkyway Image films
Films whose director won the Best Director Golden Horse Award
Films set in Hong Kong
Films shot in Hong Kong
Films with screenplays by Yau Nai-hoi
Triad films
1990s Hong Kong films